Felix Anudike-Uzomah (born January 24, 2002) is an American football defensive end for the Kansas State Wildcats. In 2022, he was named a first-team All-American and the Big 12's Defensive Player of the Year.

Early life
Anudike-Uzomah was born on January 24, 2002, in Kansas City, Missouri. He later attended Lee's Summit High School in Lee's Summit, Missouri.

College career
Anudike-Uzomah finished his freshman season at Kansas State with three tackles and one sack. He was named a starter going into his sophomore season. Anudike-Uzomah set a school record with four sacks, including two strip sacks, against TCU and was named the National Defensive Player of the Week by the Walter Camp Football Foundation. He was originally credited with six sacks, which would have tied the NCAA record, but it was ruled that the two forced fumbles went beyond the line of scrimmage and therefore qualified as rushing attempts. Anudike-Uzomah was named the Big 12 Conference's co-Defensive Lineman of the Year and was included on the all-conference team.

References

External links 
 Kansas State Wildcats bio

Living people
American football defensive ends
Kansas State Wildcats football players
2002 births
Players of American football from Kansas City, Missouri
African-American players of American football